Lukas Fernandes may refer to:

 Lukas Fernandes (footballer) (born 1993), Danish football goalkeeper
 Lukas Fernandes (soccer) (born 1998), American soccer forward